Shamgarh railway station is located in Shamgarh city of Mandsaur district, Madhya Pradesh. Its code is SGZ. It is the largest Railway Station of Mandsaur District. It has three platforms. Passenger, MEMU, Express, and Superfast trains halt here.

Trains

The following trains halt at Shamgarh railway station in both directions:

 Chennai Central–Jaipur Superfast Express
 Coimbatore–Jaipur Superfast Express
 Jaipur–Mysore Superfast Express
 Paschim Express
 Firozpur Janata Express
 Anuvrat AC Superfast Express
 Hapa–Shri Mata Vaishno Devi Katra Sarvodaya Express
 Gandhidham–Shri Mata Vaishno Devi Katra Sarvodaya Express
 Indore–New Delhi Intercity Express
 Jaipur Superfast Express
 Parasnath Express
 Golden Temple Mail
 Bandra Terminus–Ramnagar Express
 Dehradun Express
 Ranthambore Express
 Bandra Terminus–Ghazipur City Weekly Express
 Bandra Terminus–Gorakhpur Avadh Express
 Bandra Terminus–Muzaffarpur Avadh Express
 Bhagat Ki Kothi–Bilaspur Express
 Bilaspur–Bikaner Express

References

Railway stations in Mandsaur district
Kota railway division